"Five O'Clock World" (also known as "5 O'Clock World") is a song written by Allen Reynolds and recorded by American vocal group The Vogues.  It reached number 1 on WLS on 17 December 1965 and 7 January 1966, number 1 in Canada on the RPM singles chart on 10 January 1966 (their first of two chart-toppers there that year, followed by "Magic Town" in April), and number 4 in the U.S. on the Hot 100 on 15–22 January 1966 and is one of the Vogues' best-known hits, along with "You're the One".

Arrangement
The Vogues recording begins with a repeating modal figure on 12-string acoustic guitar (the sound reminiscent of medieval chanson, or contemporaries the Byrds), and swings into stride with a low brass drone, and work-song shouts drenched in reverb.  The baritone lead vocal by Bill Burkette is punctuated by counter-melodies and harmonies from the group and rises to a lilting yodel after the chorus, with crescendoing string instruments throughout, in anticipation of the after-work freedom promised in the lyric. The sound of a piano is heard, descending the scale, during the yodel.  The sound of the other members of the Vogues can be heard repeating the word "up!"  The instrumental track was a demo brought in by producer Tony Moon, cut at RCA Studio B in Nashville. The vocal was then overdubbed in Pittsburgh at Co & Ce studios, with label co-head Nick Cenci. Cenci and the group were unhappy with the drum track, which was then re-recorded using local Grains of Sand drummer, Rich Engler. Later, when the group was signed to Reprise, strings were added by arranger Ernie Freeman, overdubbed onto the original Co & Ce master.

Cover versions
American country music singer Hal Ketchum covered the song on his 1991 album Past the Point of Rescue (which the song's writer, Allen Reynolds, co-produced with Jim Rooney) and released it as a single. The song peaked at number 16 on the Hot Country Singles chart in 1992. 
Julian Cope also released a cover of the song in 1989 on his album My Nation Underground; Cope changed several of the lyrics and added in a section from the Petula Clark song "I Know a Place."  (Both songs were released in 1965.)
The song was also covered by synthpop group Ballistic Kisses and released as a 12" single in 1982. A shortened version was subsequently included on their debut album, Total Access. As with Cope's cover, some lyrics were changed to reflect views surrounding the Cold War.
Scottish rock band The Proclaimers covered the song for their 2003 album Born Innocent.
It was also covered by Bowling for Soup as a bonus track on some editions of their album Bowling for Soup Goes to the Movies.

In popular culture
"Five O'Clock World" appeared in both the background of a bar scene in the 1987 movie Good Morning, Vietnam and also on the film's soundtrack.  
It was also featured on the American sitcom The Drew Carey Show as its opening theme song during the second season.  Various other covers of the song—including the Bowling for Soup-recorded version—were used as the show's theme from 2002 to 2004. 
The song also appeared on the soundtrack to the 2003 movie Big Fish.
In 2021 Simon Mayo used the song every day for his Greatest Hits Radio Drivetime Show at 5pm every evening.

Chart history

The Vogues

Hal Ketchum

References

External links
 

1965 songs
1965 singles
1992 singles
The Vogues songs
Hal Ketchum songs
Songs written by Allen Reynolds
Song recordings produced by Allen Reynolds
RPM Top Singles number-one singles
Curb Records singles
Comedy television theme songs